"Nothing to Gein" is a song by American metal band Mudvayne. It was released as the third single from their debut album L.D. 50, and was written during the last days of the album's recording. The song is inspired by American murderer Ed Gein.

Music and lyrics
During the songwriting process, the band members paired riffs with lyrics based on what Matthew McDonough referred to as "number symbolism". According to McDonough, while he and Chad Gray wrote the lyrics to "Nothing to Gein", Greg Tribbett performed a riff which alternated in bars of four and five. Because the number nine is a lunar number, McDonough felt that the riff would fit the song's lyrics, which referred to murderer and grave robber Ed Gein, whose actions McDonough associated with nighttime activity.

Track listing

References

Songs about criminals
Cultural depictions of Ed Gein
2001 songs
Songs written by Chad Gray
Songs written by Ryan Martinie
Songs written by Matthew McDonough
Songs written by Greg Tribbett
2001 singles
Epic Records singles
Mudvayne songs
Song recordings produced by Garth Richardson